Erikson Evans (born June 5, 2003) is an American racing driver. He currently completes in the British GT Championship with Academy Motorsports. He previously completed in the 2021 U.S. F2000 National Championship with Velocity Racing Development.

Racing record

Career summary 

*Season still in progress.

Motorsports career results

American open-wheel racing results

U.S. F2000 National Championship 
(key) (Races in bold indicate pole position) (Races in italics indicate fastest lap) (Races with * indicate most race laps led)

*Season still in progress.

References 

2003 births
Living people
Racing drivers from Atlanta
Racing drivers from Georgia (U.S. state)
U.S. F2000 National Championship drivers

British GT Championship drivers
Multimatic Motorsports drivers
United States F4 Championship drivers